Two Dollar Bettor is a 1951 American film noir crime film directed by Edward L. Cahn and starring Steve Brodie, Marie Windsor and John Litel.

Plot
A middle-aged man places a two-dollar bet on a horse at the track and wins.  The widower with two teenaged daughters becomes hooked on gambling and within a week he begins cashing in his life savings to pay off his bookie.  To make matters worse, he's being grifted for thousands of dollars by a beautiful con woman and her husband. To try to get even, the man begins betting on long shots.

Cast
 Steve Brodie as Rick Bowers, alias Rick Slate
 Marie Windsor as Mary Slate
 John Litel as John Hewitt 
 Barbara Logan as Nancy Hewitt
 Robert Sherwood as Phillip Adams
 Barbara Bestar as Diane 'Dee' Hewitt
 Walter Kingsford as Carleton P. Adams
 Don Shelton as George Irwin
 Kay Lavelle as Grandma Sarah Irwin (as Kay La Lavelle)
 Carl "Alfalfa" Switzer as Chuck Nordillnger (as Carl Switzer)
 Isabel Randolph as Margaret Adams 
 Ralph Reed as Teddy Cosgrove Phelps
 Barbara Billingsley as Miss Pierson (as Barbara Billinley)
 Ralph Hodges as Chester Mitchell
 Madelon Baker as Grace Shepard (as Madelon Mitchell)

External links
 
 

1951 films
1951 crime drama films
American black-and-white films
American crime drama films
American horse racing films
Films directed by Edward L. Cahn
Films about gambling
Jack Broder Productions Inc. films
1950s English-language films
1950s American films